State Medal of Distinguished Service is one of the three civil state decorations of Turkey. The medal was established on October 24, 1983 with the Law on Medals and Orders, Act No. 2933. It is rewarded to Turkish citizens, foreigners and organizations for distinguished service in contribution to the emerge of Turkish State through generous action, self-sacrifice, accomplishment or merit at home or abroad.

The medal is bestowed by the President of Turkey upon cabinet's approval on the proposal of a government minister, the speaker of the parliament or the chief of general staff.

To the medal belong a lapel pin and a certificate.

Design
It is of gold plated metal. The medal's front depicts the Turkish moon and crescent with the initials "T.C." (abbreviation of "Türkiye Cumhuriyeti" for "Turkish Republic") in relief. The reverse depicts relevant symbols and motifs with the inscription "T.C. Devlet Şeref Madalyası" (Turkish Republic Medal of Distinguished Service). The medal is attached to a ribbon

It depicts a composition in red and white with the initials "T.C." made of enamel on gold plate.

The medal and the lapel pin are minted at the national mint and printer.

Notable recipients

 İzzet Baysal Vakfı, foundation - 1996
 Sakıp Sabancı, businessman - 1997
 Rahmi Koç, businessman - 1997
 Ahmet Çalık, businessman - 1999
 Aydın Doğan, businessman - 1999
 Gazi Yaşargil, medical scientist and neurosurgeon - 2000
 Galatasaray S.K. football team - 2000
 Turkey national basketball team - 2001
 Turkey national football team - 2002
 Şenol Güneş, footballer and coach of the national team - 2002
 Haluk Ulusoy, President of Turkish Football Federation - 2002
 Şakir Eczacıbaşı, businessman and photographer  - 1997

See also
 Turkish State Medal of Honor
 Turkish State Medal of Pride

References

Civil awards and decorations of Turkey
Awards established in 1983
Orders, decorations, and medals of Turkey